Lepicerus is a genus of myxophagan beetles containing three described species in the family Lepiceridae; it is the only extant genus in the family, with another genus, Lepiceratus only known from fossils. Extant species occur in the Neotropics, from Mexico south to Venezuela and Ecuador. Fossils referrable to the genus are known from the early Late Cretaceous of Southeast Asia.

Species
 Lepicerus bufo
 Lepicerus inaequalis
 Lepicerus pichilingue
 †Lepicerus georissoides (Kirejtshuk and Poinar 2006) Burmese amber, Myanmar Cenomanian.
 †Lepicerus mumia Jałoszyński and Yamamoto 2017 Burmese amber, Myanmar Cenomanian.
 †Lepicerus pretiosus (Kirejtshuk and Poinar 2013) Burmese amber, Myanmar Cenomanian

Extinct genera within Lepiceridae 

 †Lepiceratus Jałoszyński et al. 2020, Burmese amber, Myanmar, Cenomanian

References

External links

Myxophaga
Myxophaga genera